Semper Fi: Always Faithful, is a documentary film about the Camp Lejeune water contamination.  The film made the 15 film short list for consideration for a 2012 Academy Award for best documentary feature. The film, which debuted at the Tribeca Film Festival in April 2011, has a 100% "fresh" rating on review aggregator website Rotten Tomatoes, indicating highly positive critical reviews. The film won a documentary editing award at Tribeca and The Ridenhour Documentary Film Prize 2012. The Society of Professional Journalists presented it with its Sigma Delta Chi Award for Best Television Documentary (Network).

Synopsis 
German American Jerry Ensminger was a devoted Marine Corps Master Sgt. for nearly twenty-five years. As a drill instructor he lived and breathed the "Corps" and was responsible for indoctrinating thousands of new recruits with its motto Semper Fidelis or "Always Faithful." When Jerry's nine-year-old daughter Janey died of a rare type of leukemia, his world collapsed. As a grief-stricken father, he struggled for years to make sense of what happened. His search for answers led to the shocking discovery of  a Marine Corps cover-up of one of the largest water contamination incidents in U.S. history. Semper Fi: Always Faithful follows Jerry's mission to expose the Marine Corps and force them to live up to their motto to the thousands of Marines and their families exposed to toxic chemicals. His fight reveals a grave injustice at North Carolina's Camp Lejeune and a looming environmental crisis at military sites across the country.

Accolades 
Semper Fi: Always Faithful has won/nominated the following awards:

 Nomination for News & Documentary Emmy Awards (2013)
 Won Best Editing for the Tribeca Film Festival (2011)
 Won Best Documentary for United Nations Association Film Festival (2012)
 Woodstock Film Festival (2011)
 Won Audience Award
 Won Jury Prize
 Runners Up for Best Editing
San Diego Film Festival (2011)
Won Best Documentary

References

External links 
 
 
 C-SPAN Q&A interview with Jerry Ensminger and Rachel Libert, April 1, 2012

2011 films
2011 in the environment
2011 documentary films
American documentary films
Documentary films about water and the environment
Documentary films about veterans
Environment of North Carolina
Water pollution in the United States
United States military scandals
United States Marine Corps in the 20th century
Documentary films about the United States Marine Corps
2010s English-language films
2010s American films